Metrophanes is a Greek name for males.   

The name may refer to:

Saint Metrophanes of Byzantium, bishop of Byzantium from 306 to 314
Metrophanes of Smyrna, Christian bishop, Metropolitan of Smyrna, in the ninth century
Patriarch Metrophanes II of Constantinople, reigned from 1440 to 1443
Patriarch Metrophanes III of Constantinople, reigned from 1565 to 1572 and from 1579 to 1580
Patriarch Metrophanes of Alexandria (Metrophanes Kritopoulos), reigned between 1636 and 1639
Metrophanes, Chi Sung, 1855 – 1900, Chinese Orthodox priest and martyr

See also
Mitrofan, Slavic equivalent